The 1901 Virginia Orange and Blue football team represented the University of Virginia as an independent during the 1901 college football season. Led by Westley Abbott in is first and only season as head coach, the team compiled a record of 8–2 and claims a Southern championship.

Several Virginia players were selected All-Southern, including Christie Benet, later a United States senator for South Carolina, and Bradley Walker, later a Nashville attorney and prominent referee. Other All-Southerns were captains Robert M. Coleman, Buck Harris, and Ed Tutwiler.

Schedule

Players

Starters

Line

Backfield

Substitutes

Honors and awards
All-Southern: Christie Benet, Buck Harris, Ed Tutwiler, Robert M. Coleman, Bradley Walker.

References

Virginia
Virginia Cavaliers football seasons
Virginia Orange and Blue football